Irvin J. Wilhite Jr. (May 29, 1920 – March 15, 2020) was an American politician. He served in the North Dakota State Senate from 1967 to 1972, and was majority leader from 1971 to 1972. He died in March 2020 at the age of 99.

References

1920 births
2020 deaths
North Dakota state senators